Filip Sandberg (born July 23, 1994) is a Swedish professional ice hockey forward who is currently playing for Skellefteå AIK of the Swedish Hockey League (SHL).

Playing career
He made his Swedish Hockey League debut playing with HV71 during the 2012–13 Elitserien season.

After five years in the SHL with HV71 and following the 2016–17 championship season, Sandberg as an undrafted free agent signed his first NHL contract, agreeing to a two-year, two-way contract with the San Jose Sharks on May 23, 2017. The contract was terminated on November 15, 2018, with Sandberg having played a total of 55 games for the San Jose Barracuda of the American Hockey League.

Career statistics

Regular season and playoffs

International

Awards and honors

References

External links

1994 births
Living people
HV71 players
San Jose Barracuda players
Skellefteå AIK players
Swedish ice hockey forwards
Swedish expatriate ice hockey players in the United States
HC TPS players
VIK Västerås HK players